Velma  May Wallis (born 1960) is a Native American writer of Gwich'in Athabascan Indian descent. Her books have been translated into 17 languages.

Early life
This location could be accessed only by riverboat, airplane, snowmobile or dogsled. Velma grew up among 12 siblings. Her father died when she was 13 years old, and she stayed out of school to help her mother with the household. She later went on to receive her GED.

Independence
About 12 miles away from the village, her father had built a small cabin in the wilderness. He had been a hunter and trapper. Some time after his death around 1973, Velma surprised her family and friends by leaving home and living in the cabin for some years. She perfected her trapping, fishing and hunting skills and lived on what she could provide for herself. At one point her mother joined her during the summer to teach her more traditional skills. In this area, where the Porcupine River flows into the Yukon River, Velma Wallis lived an independent lifestyle. These experiences led to write her first book, Two Old Women, which sold 1.5 million copies worldwide.

Personal life
Velma Wallis, who has three daughters and a son, now divides her time between Fairbanks and Fort Yukon.

Awards
 2003 American Book Award, for Raising Ourselves: A Gwich'in Coming of Age Story from the Yukon River
 1993 Western States Book Award

Velma Wallis bibliography
 Two Old Women: An Alaskan Legend Of Betrayal, Courage And Survival. Epicenter Press. 1993. . 
 Bird Girl and the Man Who Followed the Sun. Epicenter Press. 1996. .

References

1960 births
20th-century American novelists
20th-century American women writers
21st-century American novelists
21st-century American women writers
20th-century Native Americans
21st-century Native Americans
Alaskan Athabaskan people
American Book Award winners
American women novelists
Gwich'in people
Living people
Native American novelists
Native American women writers
People from Fort Yukon, Alaska
Writers from Fairbanks, Alaska
20th-century Native American women
21st-century Native American women